Love Travels is the tenth studio album by American country artist, Kathy Mattea. It was released on February 4, 1997 via Mercury Records Nashville. The disc contained a total of 11 tracks that blended a mixture of different musical styles. Love Travels spawned four singles, two of which made the North American country songs charts: "455 Rocket" and the title track. The album itself reached the top 20 of the American country albums chart and was reviewed positively by critics.

Background
Steve Huey of AllMusic described Kathy Mattea as "one of the most respected female country stars of her era" as well as "a commercially successful hitmaker". During the eighties and nineties, four of Mattea's singles topped the North American country charts: "Eighteen Wheels and a Dozen Roses", "Goin' Gone", "Burnin' Old Memories" and "Come from the Heart". Several more made the top ten and top 20 during those decades. By the mid nineties, Mattea had begun changing her artistic direction. For her next album, Mattea explained that she wanted to "delver deeper" into what she was "feeling". "It's such a gift to be paid for being who you are as an artist. I'm so lucky to have a very loyal following of people who've stayed with me through all of my eclectic restlessness. They always want to see what I am going to do next," she explained in 1997.

Recording and content
Love Travels was co-produced by Mattea, along with Ben Wisch and assistant production credits from Shane Tarleton. The album was recorded between June and December 1996 at Woodland Studios, located in Nashville, Tennessee. It incorporated commercial country music with elements of country folk. Other genres explored in some selections included Celtic, Caribbean and New Orleans musical styles. Mattea told the Sun Sentinel that she wanted the songs to guide her musical direction for the album. 

Love Travels consisted of 11 tracks of material. One track featured writing credits from Mattea's husband (and songwriter), Jon Vezner. Titled "All Roads to the River" was composed with singer-songwriter, Janis Ian. The fifth features vocals from country artist, Suzy Bogguss. Titled "Further and Further Away", the song discusses how parents age as their children develop into maturity. Mattea personally connected with the song as she was watching both her parents age at the time. Other themes about romance are found on songs like "If That's What You Call Love". The sixth track, "455 Rocket", is a story song built around a man's love of an Oldsmobile 88 car. The final track, "Beautiful Fool", discusses how social leaders like Martin Luther King, Jr. tried to solve problems without using physical violence.

Critical reception

Love Travels received a mostly positive critical reception. In their review, Entertainment Weekly gave the album a B+ rating. Thom Owens of AllMusic rated the project three out of five stars. He found the album's production to evoke more polished sounds that her previous works, but nonetheless found it to be a strong collection of material. Owens further commented that it walks "the perfect middle-ground between country-folk and mainstream contemporary country." 

The Chicago Tribune gave the project three out of four stars, noting the blending the album's incorporation of various musical styles. "Mattea just keeps rolling along in her 11th studio album, another engaging effort highlighted by songs from Gillian Welch, Jim Lauderdale, Cheryl Wheeler and Janis Ian. Love and the human spirit reign triumphant in songs that urge listeners to find their muses and trust those pesky inner voices," the newspaper commented. Robert Loy of Country Standard Time found the album to be more personal that previous works in his review: "For some time now, Kathy Mattea has managed to walk the line between commercialism and a more mature artistic vision. Her previous release Walking Away a Winner was radio friendly, but she's back on more personal, even spiritual ground on Love Travels.

Release, chart performance and singles
Love Travels was released on February 4, 1997 on Mercury Records Nashville. It was originally offered as both a compact disc and a cassette. It was later released to digital sites for downloading and streaming purposes. The album entered the American Billboard Top Country Albums chart on February 22, 1997 and spent 28 weeks there. On April 12, 1997, it peaked at number 15 on the chart. It also made the Billboard 200 all-genre chart, reaching number 121 on April 12, 1997 after 14 weeks on the chart. It also became her second album to make the United Kingdom's Official Charts Company all-genre chart, reaching number 65.

Four singles were spawned from Love Travels. The first was "455 Rocket", which was issued on January 18, 1997. On April 19, 1997, the song peaked at number 21 on the Billboard Hot Country Songs chart. It also reached the top 20 of Canada's RPM country chart, peaking at number 16 around the same time. The next single issued from the album was the track, "I'm on Your Side", which was issued to radio on May 19, 1997. The single did not chart on Billboard'''s country survey. It was followed by the title track, which was released in August 1997. The song later peaked at number 39 on the Billboard country chart after 16 weeks there. It also reached number 79 on the RPM country songs chart. The final single issued from Love Travels was the track, "Patiently Waiting", which not chart on Billboard. It was released in 1998.

Track listing

Personnel
All credits are adapted from the liner notes of Love Travels''.

"Love Travels"
 Chris Carmichael - fiddle, cello, handclaps
 Bill Cooley - acoustic guitar
 Bob Halligan Jr. - piano, acoustic guitar, background vocals, handclaps
 James "Hutch" Hutchinson - bass guitar
 Mary Ann Kennedy - background vocals
 Abe Laboriel Jr. - drums, percussion
 Tim Lauer - accordion, harmonium, handclaps
 Hunter Lee - pennywhistle, bagpipes, handclaps
 Duke Levine - electric guitar, handclaps
 Kathy Mattea - handclaps
 Michael McDonald - background vocals
 Donna McElroy - background vocals
 Steve Sturm - pedal steel guitar
 Suzy Wills - background vocals

"Sending Me Angels"
 Bob Bailey - background vocals
 Kim Fleming - background vocals
 Paul Franklin - pedal steel guitar
 Vicki Hampton - background vocals
 James "Hutch" Hutchinson - bass guitar, handclaps
 Abe Laboriel Jr. - drums, handclaps
 Duke Levine - electric guitar, handclaps
 Kathy Mattea - handclaps
 Louis Nunley - background vocals
 Don Potter - acoustic guitar
 Matt Rollings - piano, Hammond B-3 organ
 Kirby Shelstad - percussion

"Patiently Waiting"
 Jonatha Brooke - background vocals
 Farrell Morris - congas, shaker, tambourine
 James "Hutch" Hutchinson - bass guitar
 Jim Keltner - drums
 Duke Levine - electric guitar
 Don Potter - acoustic guitar
 Matt Rollings - piano, Hammond B-3 organ
 Suzy Wills - background vocals

"If That's What You Call Love"
 Lionel Cartwright - piano, background vocals
 Kathy Chiavola - background vocals
 Paul Franklin - pedal steel guitar
 James "Hutch" Hutchinson - bass guitar
 Abe Laboriel Jr. - drums
 Tim Lauer - synthesizer
 Duke Levine - acoustic guitar, electric guitar
 Don Potter - acoustic guitar
 Kirby Shelstad - percussion

"Further and Further Away"
 Suzy Bogguss - background vocals
 Abe Laboriel Jr. - drums, percussion
 John Leventhal - bass guitar, electric guitar, acoustic guitar, mando-guitar, bouzouki
 Ben Wisch - synthesizer

"455 Rocket"
 Pat Buchanan - electric guitar
 Jerry Douglas - Dobro
 Stuart Duncan - mandolin
 Bob Halligan Jr. - background vocals
 James "Hutch" Hutchinson - bass guitar, foot taps, knee slaps
 Kirk "Jelly Roll" Johnson - harmonica
 Jim Keltner - drums, maracas, foot taps, knee slaps
 Kathy Mattea - foot taps, knee slaps
 Don Potter - acoustic guitar
 Kim Richey - background vocals

"I'm on Your Side"
 Pat Bucahanan - electric guitar
 James "Hutch" Hutchinson - bass guitar
 Jim Keltner - drums, tambourine
 Jim Lauderdale - acoustic guitar
 George Marinelli - electric guitar
 Kathy Mattea - background vocals
 Kirby Shelstad - percussion

"The Bridge"
 James "Hutch" Hutchinson - bass guitar
 Mary Ann Kennedy - background vocals
 Abe Laboriel Jr. - drums
 Duke Levine - slide guitar
 Michael McDonald - background vocals
 Don Potter - acoustic guitar
 Matt Rollings - Wurlitzer electric piano, Hammond B-3 organ

"All Roads to the River"
 Jonatha Brooke - background vocals
 James "Hutch" Hutchinson - bass guitar
 John Jennings - baritone guitar
 Abe Laboriel Jr. - drums
 Hunter Lee - digeridoo
 Duke Levine - mandola, slide guitar
 Don Potter - acoustic guitar
 Kirby Shelstad - percussion
 Suzy Wills - background vocals

"The End of the Line"
 James "Hutch" Hutchinson - bass guitar
 Mary Ann Kennedy - background vocals
 Abe Laboriel Jr. - drums, percussion
 Duke Levine - electric guitar
 Michael McDonald - background vocals
 Don Potter - acoustic guitar, resonator guitar
 Matt Rollings - Wurlitzer electric piano
 Ben Wisch - synthesizer
 Jonathan Yudkin - mandolin

"Beautiful Fool"
 Phil Keaggy - acoustic guitar
 Edgar Meyer - double bass
 Ben Wisch - synthesizer

Technical personnel
 Ted Jensen – mastering
 Matt Knobel – engineering
 Kathy Mattea – producer
 John McGriff – assistant technician
 Shane Tarleton – assistant producer
 Ben Wisch – producer, engineering, mixing

Charts

Weekly charts

Year-end charts

Release history

References

1997 albums
Albums produced by Kathy Mattea
Kathy Mattea albums
Mercury Nashville albums